Richard Lee Morris (born November 6, 1968) is an American attorney and Republican politician.

Early life, education, military career
Morris was born in Fort Polk, Louisiana, during the Vietnam War. He was raised in Kansas.

Morris served in the United States Navy from 1988 through 2010. The first part of his career was spent in submarines. After receiving a B.A. degree in sociology from Saint Leo University in 1998, he transferred to become a Legalman. He was later commissioned as a Limited Duty Officer, after which he received a J.D. from Regent University. He served in Iraq working on reform of the Iraqi judicial system.

Political career
After retiring from the Navy in 2010, Morris was elected chair of the Isle of Wight County Republican Committee. In November 2011, he defeated 10-term Democratic incumbent William K. Barlow for the 64th House district seat by a vote of 12,960 to 10,467.  Morris won re-election to a 2nd term on November 5, 2013 running unopposed.

Morris did not seek re-election in 2017.

Notes

External links

1968 births
Living people
Republican Party members of the Virginia House of Delegates
People from Isle of Wight County, Virginia
21st-century American politicians